The Vine Church is a non-denominational Evangelical Christian church located in the Wanchai District of Hong Kong.

The Vine Band is notable for the "upbeat rock" worship music it plays, and has recently undertaken a tour through Southeast Asia.

See also 
 Union Church, Hong Kong

References

External links 
 Official website

Religious buildings and structures in Hong Kong
Protestant churches in Hong Kong
1997 establishments in Hong Kong
Churches completed in 1997